Electron degeneracy pressure is a particular manifestation of the more general phenomenon of quantum degeneracy pressure. The Pauli exclusion principle disallows two identical half-integer spin particles (electrons and all other fermions) from simultaneously occupying the same quantum state. The result is an emergent pressure against compression of matter into smaller volumes of space. Electron degeneracy pressure results from the same underlying mechanism that defines the electron orbital structure of elemental matter. For bulk matter with no net electric charge, the attraction between electrons and nuclei exceeds (at any scale) the mutual repulsion of electrons plus the mutual repulsion of nuclei; so in absence of electron degeneracy pressure, the matter would collapse into a single nucleus. In 1967, Freeman Dyson showed that solid matter is stabilized by quantum degeneracy pressure rather than electrostatic repulsion. Because of this, electron degeneracy creates a barrier to the gravitational collapse of dying stars and is responsible for the formation of white dwarfs.

From the Fermi gas theory 

Electrons are members of a family of particles known as fermions. Fermions, like the proton or the neutron, follow Pauli's principle and Fermi–Dirac statistics. In general, for an ensemble of non-interacting fermions, also known as a Fermi gas, each particle can be treated independently with a single-fermion energy given by the purely kinetic term, 

where  is the momentum of one particle and  its mass. Every possible momentum state of an electron within this volume up to the Fermi momentum  being occupied.

The degeneracy pressure at zero temperature can be computed as

where V is the total volume of the system and Etot is the total energy of the ensemble. Specifically for the electron degeneracy pressure,   is substituted by the electron mass  and the Fermi momentum is obtained from the Fermi energy, so the electron degeneracy pressure is given by

where   is the free electron density (the number of free electrons per unit volume). For the case of a metal, one can prove that this equation remains approximately true for temperatures lower than the Fermi temperature, about  kelvin.

When particle energies reach relativistic levels, a modified formula is required.

Examples

Metals 
For the case of electrons in crystalline solid, several approximations are carefully justified to treat the electrons as independent particles. Usual models are the free electron model and the nearly free electron model. In the appropriate systems, the electron degeneracy pressure can be calculated; it can be shown that this pressure is an important contributor to the compressibility or bulk modulus of metals.

White dwarfs 

Electron degeneracy pressure will halt the gravitational collapse of a star if its mass is below the Chandrasekhar limit (1.44 solar masses).  This is the pressure that prevents a white dwarf star from collapsing. A star exceeding this limit and without significant thermally generated pressure will continue to collapse to form either a neutron star or black hole, because the degeneracy pressure provided by the electrons is weaker than the inward pull of gravity.

See also 
 Exchange interaction
 Fermi level
 Bose–Einstein condensate
 Nuclear density

References

Pauli exclusion principle
Stellar evolution
White dwarfs